Michel Louis André Worms de Romilly (23 September 1869 – 4 October 1928) was a French fencer. He competed in the men's épée event at the 1900 Summer Olympics.

References

External links
 

1869 births
1928 deaths
French male épée fencers
Olympic fencers of France
Fencers at the 1900 Summer Olympics
People from Saumur
Sportspeople from Maine-et-Loire
20th-century French people